Ahmed Saraku is a Ghanaian amateur boxer who won silver at the Light Heavyweight 81kg at the African Championship Madagascar 2007.At the 2007 All-Africa Games he drop down to middleweight and won Silver. He qualified for the Olympics by winning two fights and won Silver early 2008.Married to Ghanaian born Australian lady Sabina Saraku the couple welcome their first daughter Renee Saraku born 11 November 2019.

Career
He became national welterweight champion in 2005 and went to the Commonwealth Games 2006 where he lost his first bout 7:13 to Neil Perkins.

At the African Championships he competed at light heavy and won silver.

At the AllAfrica Games he dropped down to middleweight and lost the final only 8:9 to local hero Nabil Kassel, at the world championships he lost his first bout to Bosco Draskovic.

He qualified for the Olympics by winning two bouts in a qualifier, one against Daniel Shishia.

External links
 Bio
 All Africa games 2007
 

1986 births
Living people
Middleweight boxers
Welterweight boxers
Boxers at the 2006 Commonwealth Games
Boxers at the 2008 Summer Olympics
Olympic boxers of Ghana
Ghanaian male boxers
African Games silver medalists for Ghana
African Games medalists in boxing
Competitors at the 2007 All-Africa Games
Commonwealth Games competitors for Ghana